Bazzania adnexa is a species of liverwort in the Lepidoziaceae family. A large liverwort, appearing in bright green mats or loose cushions, found in moist forests. Plants are characteristically branched in a Y-shape. Commonly found in suitable habitats in Australia and New Zealand.

References

Lepidoziaceae
Flora of New South Wales
Flora of Queensland
Flora of Victoria (Australia)
Flora of Tasmania
Flora of New Zealand